Sylvester Robert "Bob" Foley Jr. (September 19, 1928 – December 31, 2019) was a four star admiral in the United States Navy who served as Commander in Chief Pacific from 1982 to 1985. He was born in Manchester, New Hampshire. He graduated from the United States Naval Academy in 1950.

After graduating as a member of the United States Naval Academy's Class of 1950, Foley served in the Navy for 35 years.  Foley quickly rose through the ranks and held several operational commands during his distinguished naval career, including serving as commander of the US Seventh Fleet and commander-in-chief of the Pacific Fleet.

Foley retired from the Navy in 1985, at which point he served as President Ronald Reagan's assistant secretary of energy for defense programs, where he had responsibility for the nation's nuclear weapons complex.

In 1988, Foley entered the private sector and was named president of the Advanced Technology Group at ICF Kaiser Engineers.  In 1991, he joined the Raytheon Company, where he served as vice president of marketing, president of Raytheon Japan, and vice president of Asian operations.

After retiring from Raytheon, Foley served as a consultant to the departments of defense and energy and was a member of President George W. Bush's energy transition team.

In 2003, Foley was appointed the University of California's vice president for laboratory management.  In his role, Foley has responsibility for the university's oversight and management at three national laboratories: Los Alamos, Lawrence Livermore, and Lawrence Berkeley.

Foley earned a master's degree in international affairs from George Washington University in 1968.  Additionally, Foley graduated from the Naval War College in 1968 and was recognized as a Distinguished Graduate of the Air War College.

Foley died at his home in Maryland on December 31, 2019, at the age of 91.

Awards and decorations

References

1928 births
2019 deaths
Grand Cordons of the Order of the Rising Sun
Recipients of the Distinguished Service Order (Vietnam)
Recipients of the Legion of Honour
Recipients of the Navy Distinguished Service Medal
United States Naval Academy alumni
United States Navy admirals